Langhko Township or Langkho Township is a township of Langhko District in the Shan State of Burma.

Geography

The capital town is Langkho (Langhkö), located in the northern part. The township borders with Mae Hong Son Province of Thailand in the south.

Further reading
 Myanmar States/Divisions & Townships Overview Map
 Township Map - Kayah, Shan State (South) and Shan State (East)
 Langkho Township - Shan State - Mimu

References

 
Townships of Shan State
Langhko District